Winter Games is a sports video game developed by Epyx (and released in Europe by U.S. Gold), based on sports featured in the Winter Olympic Games.

A snow-and-ice themed follow-up to the highly successful Summer Games, Winter Games was released in 1985 for the Commodore 64 and later ported to several popular home computers and video game consoles of the 1980s.

The game was presented as a virtual multi-sport carnival called the "Epyx Winter Games" (there was no official IOC licensing in place) with up to 8 players each choosing a country to represent, and then taking turns competing in various events to try for a medal.

Events
The events available vary slightly depending on the platform, but include some or all of the following:
Slalom skiing
Ski jumping
Biathlon
Bobsled
Figure skating
Speed skating
Luge
Freestyle skiing; more precisely, the aerial skiing discipline, called "Hot Dog Aerials" in the game
Free skating

The game allowed you to compete in all of the events sequentially, choose a few events, choose just one event, or practice an event.

Ports

Winter Games was ported to the Amiga, Apple II, Atari ST, Apple Macintosh, Apple IIGS, Amstrad CPC, ZX Spectrum, and IBM PC computer platforms, and to the Atari 2600, Atari 7800, Nintendo Entertainment System, and the Family Computer Disk System video game consoles. In 2004, it was featured as one of the games on the C64 Direct-to-TV. A Virtual Console version was released in Europe on February 20, 2009.

Reception
Winter Games was Epyx's best-selling Commodore game as of late 1987. Its sales had surpassed 250,000 copies by November 1989.

Info rated Winter Games four-plus stars out of five, stating that each event was good enough to be sold separately, and concluding that it was "Sports simulation at its best!". In 1985, Zzap!64 gave 94% for the game calling it "another classic sport simulation from Epyx". Lemon64 website users have given average vote of 8.6 which places the game on top 20 list on the site. The game was reviewed in 1988 in Dragon #132 by Hartley, Patricia, and Kirk Lesser in "The Role of Computers" column. The reviewers gave the game 3½ out of 5 stars. The Spectrum version topped the charts for the month of April. However, the NES and Famicom Disk System versions were critically panned for unresponsive controls, abysmal music and poor graphics.

The Angry Video Game Nerd reviewed the NES version of the game in December of 2009. In it, he calls the game's controls some of the worst in a game ever.

In 1996, Next Generation listed the "Games" series collectively as number 89 on its "Top 100 Games of All Time". The magazine stated that though the games had great graphics for their time, their most defining qualities were their competitive multiplayer modes and "level of control that has yet to be equaled".

References

External links

Winter Games: Package and Manual Scans Images of Winter Games box, manual and screen shots at c64sets.com

1985 video games
Amiga games
Amstrad CPC games
Apple II games
Apple IIGS games
Atari 2600 games
Atari 7800 games
Atari ST games
Commodore 64 games
Epyx games
Famicom Disk System games
MSX games
Nintendo Entertainment System games
U.S. Gold games
Video games developed in the United States
Virtual Console games
Winter Olympic video games
ZX Spectrum games
Single-player video games
Atelier Double games